The  is a travelling exhibition based on the Pokémon media franchise, displaying illustrations and "life-size" sculpted renditions of the skeletons of fossil Pokémon, along with the actual fossils of the real-life prehistoric animals and other organisms on which they were based. The exhibit was created by the National Museum of Nature and Science and The Pokémon Company.

The Pokémon Fossil Museum opened at the Mikasa City Museum in Mikasa, Hokkaido, Japan, on 4 July 2021, and remained there until 20 September. It has since travelled to other museums, and is set to be on display at the Niigata Science Museum in Niigata from 4 March to 25 June 2023.

In July 2022, a virtual tour of the exhibit was made available online, with virtual reality (VR) headset compatibility.

Overview
The Pokémon media franchise, created by Satoshi Tajiri in 1996, is centered on fictional creatures called "Pokémon". In the Pokémon video games and related media, the term "fossil Pokémon" is used to refer to both ancient Pokémon brought back to life from extinction by resurrecting their fossils, and their evolutions.

Designed to educate children about fossils and dinosaurs, the Pokémon Fossil Museum features "life-size", three-dimensional sculpted models of the skeletons of fossil Pokémon, along with illustrations of the Pokémon and diagrams of their fictional skeletal structures; alongside the Pokémon are illustrations and actual excavated fossils of their real-life prehistoric counterparts, with informational signs providing facts about the animals and organisms upon which the Pokémon were based. The layout of the exhibition is intended to allow visitors to compare the fictional Pokémon with their real-life inspirations. Some of the comparisons featured in the exhibit include Omanyte and ammonites; Aerodactyl and pterosaurs; Archen and Archaeopteryx; Tyrantrum and Tyrannosaurus; Aurorus and Amargasaurus; and Bastiodon and ceratopsian dinosaurs like Triceratops. Also featured are fossil Pokémon based on living fossils—extant taxon that cosmetically resemble related species from the fossil record—such as Kabuto and horseshoe crabs, and Relicanth and coelacanths. Throughout the exhibit are images of "excavator Pikachu", a Pikachu wearing a hat with a fossil motif.

History

The Pokémon Fossil Museum was proposed by Daisuke Aiba, a senior researcher for the Mikasa City Museum. In an interview with Oricon, Aiba stated, "Since I was a child, I have loved Pokémon and paleontology," and explained that he and the other organizers of the exhibit wanted to introduce paleontology to children through the use of fossil Pokémon. Biological illustrator Genya Masukawa and artist  provided the illustrations for the exhibition.

The exhibition first opened at the Mikasa City Museum in Mikasa, Hokkaido, on 4 July 2021, and remained there until 20 September. It then moved to the Shimane Nature Museum of Mt. Sanbe in Ōda, Shimane, from 9 October 2021 to 30 January 2022, before travelling to the Toyohashi Museum of Natural History in Toyohashi, where it opened on 16 July 2022. Due to rain, the opening ceremony was held inside the building, and featured a ribbon cutting attended by Toyohashi mayor Koichi Sahara, representative students from Futagawa Elementary School, and a costumed mascot of excavator Pikachu. Additionally, four Pokéfuta (manhole covers decorated with drawings of Pokémon) were unveiled, with intentions to place them around the city.

That same month, a virtual tour of the Pokémon Fossil Museum was made available online. As well as being able to virtually explore the exhibition using a smartphone or computer, there is an option to navigate it using a virtual reality (VR) headset, with the website recommending the use of the Oculus Quest 2.

The exhibit is scheduled to be on display at the Niigata Science Museum in Niigata from 4 March to 25 June 2023.

Attendance and reception
On 10 October 2022, the total number of visitors to the Pokémon Fossil Museum at the Toyohashi Museum of Natural History surpassed 100,000, with the 100,000th family to attend being given a commemorative gift. Toyohashi-born model Nashiko Momotsuki is among those who have attended the exhibition there.

On 18 December 2022, the total number of visitors to the exhibit at the Ōita Prefectural Art Museum surpassed 10,000; the 10,000th family to attend received a stuffed toy as a souvenir. On 5 January 2023, the total number of visitors to the Ōita exhibit surpassed 30,000.

Melissa T. Miller of Nerdist, in an article about the virtual tour of the exhibit, wrote that it successfully demonstrates the influence of zoology on the design of Pokémon, and that, though the displays throughout the exhibit feature Japanese text, "they include enough pictures and obvious comparisons between the real-life animals and Pokémon to make it universally interesting."

Dates at museums

See also
 Poképark — a travelling theme park that existed in 2005 and 2006

References

External links
 

Museum events
Traveling exhibits
Pokémon
Fossil museums
Paleontology in Japan
Paleontology mass media